Highland Terror is a 1984 role-playing game adventure for Chill published by Pacesetter.

Contents
Highland Terror is the second adventure for Chill, in which the player characters confront the Loch Ness Monster and Celtic gods.

Reception
William A. Barton reviewed Highland Terror in Space Gamer No. 75. Barton commented that "Highland Terror is a solid adventure for Chill (or other supernatural horror RPGs), and shows improvement over the game's first adventure supplement – which bodes well for both Pacesetter and Chill fans."

Reviews
Game News #6 (Aug., 1985)

References

Chill (role-playing game)
Role-playing game adventures
Role-playing game supplements introduced in 1984